Crime in Merseyside is the  Crime in Merseyside is the responsibility of Merseyside Police, and its chief constable Andy Cooke. Unlike Greater Manchester, the area still has a Police and Crime Commissioner.

History

In the year ending 2018, Greater Manchester had around 334,000 recorded crimes, Lancashire had around 165,000 recorded crimes, and Merseyside had 134,000 recorded crimes.

Types of crime
In a 2017-18 report, it said that there were 153 active organised crime gangs in Merseyside.

Burglary
In a 2017-18 report by the Police and Crime Commissioner, it was found that four out of five burglaries in the area went unsolved. The Press Association found that 86% of burglaries had no identified suspect.

Rape
There are 94 recorded rapes per month in the area.

Areas

Police in the area have to deal with around 340 crimes per day. The police get around 1 million calls a year in the area.

See also
 Crime in Greater Manchester

References

External links
 Merseyside Police

 
Organised crime in England